The Soul Brothers Six were an American rhythm and blues band formed in Rochester, New York, during the mid-1960s. They are best remembered for their songs "Some Kind of Wonderful", which was later a hit for Grand Funk Railroad and "I'll Be Loving You" which was a hit record on the 1970s Northern soul scene in the UK.

History
The band was originally called the Soul Brothers Five and featured brothers Sam Armstrong, Charles Armstrong, Moses Armstrong, Harry Armstrong and Gene Armstrong. Shortly after the group's formation, vocalist John Ellison joined, prompting a name change. This line-up released two unsuccessful singles in 1965, "Stop Hurting Me" and "I Don't Want to Cry", before both Harry Armstrong and Gene Armstrong left the group, being replaced by Vonn Elle Benjamin and Lester Peleman.

It was this line-up that released the single "Don't Neglect Your Baby" before Sam Armstrong left the group to be replaced by Joe Johnson. They then signed a deal with Atlantic Records after being introduced to Jerry Wexler by a Philadelphia DJ and subsequently released "Some Kind of Wonderful" which reached No. 91 on the Billboard Hot 100. They followed with several more unsuccessful singles before being dropped by Atlantic.

This prompted Charles Armstrong, Harry Armstrong, Vonn Elle Benjamin and Lester Peleman to leave the group and be replaced by James Swails Jr, Charles Pevy and Eddie Reno. This line-up released four singles as John Ellison and the Soul Brothers Six (despite there only being five band members) during the 1970s, before disbanding.

John Ellison continued on in the music industry and released two solo albums, Welcome Back in 1993 and Missing You, in 2000.

Discography

References

External links
Answers.com
Soul Brothers Six Discography at Discogs.

Atlantic Records artists
American funk musical groups
American soul musical groups
Musical groups established in 1965
Musical groups disestablished in 1976
Musical groups from Rochester, New York